This is a list of AM radio stations in the United States having call signs beginning with the letters WN to WS.

WN--

WO

WP--

WQ--

WR--

WS--

See also 
 North American call sign

AM radio stations in the United States by call sign (initial letters WN-WS)